Edakkad State assembly constituency was one of the 140 state legislative assembly constituencies in Kerala state in southern India, before the 2008 delimitation of constituencies. It was one of the 7 state legislative assembly constituencies included in the Kannur Lok Sabha constituency until the 2008 delimitation. The last election to the constituency was conducted in  2006, and the MLA was Kadannappalli Ramachandran of Congress (Secular).

After the delimitation in 2008, Chelora, Edakkad, and Munderi Gram Panchayats became a part of the Kannur (State Assembly constituency), whereas Anjarakkandy, Chembilode, Kadambur, Muzhappilangad, and Peralasseri were added to the newly formed Dharmadam (State Assembly constituency).

Edakkad Assembly constituency came into existence in 1965. It was created by replacing the Cannanore-II Assembly  Constituency which had existed from 1957 to 1965.

Local self governed segments
Edakkad Niyamasabha constituency was composed of the following local self governed segments:

The Gram panchayats of Chelora and Edakkad has now merged with the Kannur Municipal Corporation in 2015.

Election history

Election results
Percentage change (±%) denotes the change in the number of votes from the immediate previous election.

Niyamasabha Election 2006
There were 1,60,984 registered voters in Edakkad Constituency for the 2006 Kerala Niyamasabha Election.

Niyama Sabha Election 2001
There were 1,59,551 registered voters in Edakkad Constituency for the 2001 Kerala Niyamasabha Election.

See also
 Edakkad
 Kannur (State Assembly constituency)
 Dharmadam (State Assembly constituency)
 Kannur district
 List of constituencies of the Kerala Legislative Assembly
 2006 Kerala Legislative Assembly election

References

External Links
 

Former assembly constituencies of Kerala